Magherno is a comune (municipality) in the Province of Pavia in the Italian region Lombardy, located about 30 km southeast of Milan and about 15 km east of Pavia.

Magherno borders the following municipalities: Copiano, Gerenzago, Torre d'Arese, Villanterio, Vistarino.

References

External links
 Official website

Cities and towns in Lombardy